Bezgolosovo is a rural locality (a selo) and the administrative center of Bezgolosovsky Selsoviet, Aleysky District, Altai Krai, Russia. The population was 598 as of 2013. There are 13 streets.

Geography 
Bezgolosovo is located on the Aley River, 15 km east of Aleysk (the district's administrative centre) by road. Bolshepanyushevo and Uspenovka are the nearest rural localities.

References 

Rural localities in Aleysky District